Vigo railway station served the Barley Mow and Vigo areas of the town of Birtley in Tyne and Wear (historically County Durham) in England. The station, on the Stanhope and Tyne Railway , was opened in 1835 and closed in 1853. It reopened in 1862 and closed for the final time in 1869. 

The line remained open to passengers until 1955 and to freight until the 1980s. The site of the station has since been demolished and the trackbed now forms part of the Consett and Sunderland Railway Path between Washington and Chester-le-Street following the course of the old railway line.

References

External links 

Disused railway stations in Tyne and Wear
Former North Eastern Railway (UK) stations
Railway stations in Great Britain opened in 1835
Railway stations in Great Britain closed in 1862
1835 establishments in England